Sean Solia (born 15 December 1992) is a New Zealand-Samoan cricketer. He has played international cricket for Samoa, and since 2016 has played in New Zealand domestic cricket for Auckland.

Early life
He comes from Auckland and attended St Peter's College. His father is Samoan.

Domestic career
He made his first-class debut for Auckland against Canterbury on 22 November 2016 in the 2016–17 Plunket Shield season. He made his Twenty20 debut for the Auckland Aces on 4 December 2016 in the 2016–17 Super Smash. He made his List A debut for Auckland on 15 January 2017 in the 2016–17 Ford Trophy, scoring 152 runs. In June 2018, he was awarded a contract with Auckland for the 2018–19 season. In September 2018, he was named in the Auckland Aces' squad for the 2018 Abu Dhabi T20 Trophy.

In June 2020, he was offered a contract by Auckland ahead of the 2020–21 domestic cricket season. In March 2022, in the 2021–22 Plunket Shield season, Solia scored his maiden century in first-class cricket.

International career
In August 2018, he was named in Samoa's squad for Group A of the 2018–19 ICC World Twenty20 East Asia-Pacific Qualifier tournament. In Samoa's opening match of the qualifier, against Papua New Guinea, Solia top-scored for his team with 39 runs. He was the joint-leading wicket-taker in the tournament, with eleven dismissals in six matches.

In November 2020, Solia was named in the New Zealand A cricket team for practice matches against the touring West Indies team.

References

External links
 

1992 births
Living people
New Zealand cricketers
Samoan cricketers
Auckland cricketers
Cricketers from Auckland
People educated at St Peter's College, Auckland
New Zealand sportspeople of Samoan descent